Corybas expansus, commonly known as the flared helmet orchid, is a species of terrestrial orchid endemic to South Australia. It has a heart-shaped to more or less round leaf and a single purplish flower with greenish or transparent areas. It is a vulnerable species, found in near-coastal sand and leaf litter.

Description 
Corybas expansus is a terrestrial, perennial, deciduous, herb which forms small colonies. The leaf is bright green on the upper surface and silvery green on the lower side. It is erect near its base then curves forward, partly covering the labellum. The upper part of the labellum is reddish purple grading to white from the centre down. Flowering occurs in July and August.

Taxonomy 
Corybas expansus was first formally described in 1991 by David Jones from a specimen collected in the Warrenben Conservation Park and the description was published in Australian Orchid Research. The specific epithet (expansus) is a Latin word meaning "spread out", referring to the flared labellum.

In 2002, David Jones and Mark Clements proposed splitting Corybas into smaller genera and placing this species into Corysanthes but the change has not been widely accepted.

Distribution and habitat
The flared helmet orchid grows in shrubland and shrubby forest in coastal areas on the southern tip of the Eyre, Yorke and Fleurieu Peninsulas and on Kangaroo Island.

Conservation
Corybas expansus is classified as "vulnerable" under the South Australian National Parks and Wildlife Act 1972. The main threats to the species are inappropriate fire regimes and weed invasion.

References 

expansus
Endemic orchids of Australia
Orchids of South Australia
Plants described in 1991